Lotte Meldgaard Pedersen (born 13 October 1972) is a Danish Olympic sailor competing in match racing. She won the 2015 ISAF Women's Match Racing World Championship.

References

Danish female sailors (sport)
Olympic sailors of Denmark
Elliott 6m class sailors
Royal Danish Yacht Club sailors
1972 births
Living people
Sailors at the 2012 Summer Olympics – Elliott 6m